Epeiromulona phelina is a moth of the subfamily Arctiinae. It was described by Druce in 1885. It is found in Panama.

The length of the forewings is 9 mm. The wings are white, spotted with 15 black spots and bars. The fringe of the forewing is pale yellowish orange.

References

 Natural History Museum Lepidoptera generic names catalog

Lithosiini
Moths described in 1885